Lee Hsueh-lin (born as Lee Chih-Ming (李至明) on 31 January 1984 in Pingtung County, Taiwan) is a Taiwanese professional basketball player for New Taipei CTBC DEA of the T1 League. Lee has been a leading competitor in several top Asian leagues, including most prominently with the Beijing Ducks in the Chinese Basketball Association (CBA). During the 2011-2012 season, he helped the team win its first-ever CBA championship, and he was named CBA Finals MVP, several months after the campaign ended.

Dubbed the "Allen Iverson of Taiwan" by some observers, Lee has been acclaimed for his quickness and maneuverability with the basketball, since high school, where he won a scoring title.  He served as the primary point guard for the Chinese Taipei men's national basketball team for most of the mid-2000s and early 2010s.

No longer a main scorer for his teams, Lee is now recognized for his low turnover rate, as well as his ability to stretch the defense with sharp driving and quick and accurate shooting, whenever the situation demands it. He is also lauded for his assist making capabilities, as well as his defensive prowess, especially against faster adversaries.

Professional career
In Taiwan's Super Basketball League, Lee helped the Yulon Dinos win titles in 2004, 2005, 2006, and 2010.

His CBA Finals MVP honor with the Beijing Ducks in 2012, did not come without controversy, as he only averaged 11 points per game during the series, while star American import Stephon Marbury poured in 33 points per game. Players from overseas were not allowed to win the award at the time, a rule which was later changed. Officials from China do not consider players from Taiwan to be foreigners, so the award was quietly given to Lee several months after the end of the season. On August 29, 2021, Lee has signed with New Taipei CTBC DEA of the T1 League for two years.

National team career
On the international scene, Lee helped lead the Chinese Taipei national basketball team to the main draw at four consecutive FIBA Asia Championship tournaments, where the team finished sixth in 2007, fifth in 2009, eighth in 2011, and fourth in 2013.

References

See also
FIBA Asia Championship
Super Basketball League

1984 births
Living people
Hakka sportspeople
People from Pingtung County
Point guards
Beijing Ducks players
Shanghai Sharks players
Taiwanese men's basketball players
Taiwanese people of Hakka descent
Basketball players at the 2002 Asian Games
Basketball players at the 2006 Asian Games
Basketball players at the 2010 Asian Games
Taiwanese expatriate basketball people in China
Asian Games competitors for Chinese Taipei
Formosa Dreamers players
New Taipei CTBC DEA players
T1 League players
Chinese Taipei men's national basketball team players
Yulon Luxgen Dinos players
Guangzhou Loong Lions players
Xinjiang Flying Tigers players
Super Basketball League players